Small Rockets was a British computer game developer located in Guildford, England. The company was founded in October 2000 and created and sold PC games online.

History 
Small Rockets was born from the ashes of Fiendish Games, a department of Criterion Games (also known as Criterion Software), that was started to test the waters for delivering games online rather than through traditional retail channels. When Fiendish Games was shut down, the then head of department Jonathan Small set up Small Rockets to continue where Fiendish Games had left off. The company licensed the games created by Fiendish Games from Criterion, and most of the Fiendish Games employees moved with Jonathan to the new company.

(Note, Fiendish Games has no connection with the board game company of the same name; the board game company changed its name to Fiendish Board Games after coming to an agreement with Criterion Games).

In addition to its commercial games Small Rockets also produced a bespoke 'one off' game called 'HP Spy Academy' for a HP exhibition at 'Stuff Live' in 2002.

Work continued on several more PC titles and a Game Boy Advance title until most of the employees had to be let go, largely for financial reasons, in 2003.

Due to the increasing costs of running a UK-registered limited-liability company from the US, the decision was made in 2012 to shut the company down. The Small Rockets website displayed a formal notice of the shutdown from early July 2012, at which point the site's shop was also disabled. Full shutdown of the Small Rockets servers (including the website itself) occurred in late August 2012. Jonathan has stated that he hopes to continue Small Rockets' Red Ace franchise.

Small Rockets Games

Games originally written as part of Fiendish Games 
 Natural Fawn Killers (abbreviated NFK)
 Tower of the Ancients
 Master of the Skies: The Red Ace (previously known as Hunt for the Red Baron)
 Art is Dead
 Hot Chix 'n' Gear Stix
 Hot Chix 'n' Gear Stix 2
 Small Rockets Poker
 Small Rockets Mah Jongg
 Small Rockets Backgammon

Games released wholly by Small Rockets 

 NFK: Santa's Gone Postal
 Star Monkey
 Ultra Assault
 Red Ace Squadron
 Assimilation
 Sean Murray Wakeboarding (GBA)
 Sinbad (PC)

References

External links
 The Small Rockets website, on the Internet Archive
Small Rockets entry at MobyGames

Video game development companies
Defunct video game companies of the United Kingdom

mad:Global Thermonuclear Warfare